Synchiropus richeri, the Richer's dragonet, is a species of fish in the family Callionymidae, the dragonets. It is found in the Western Central Pacific.

Etymology
The fish is named in honor of carcinologist Bertrand Richer de Forges, of the Institut de Recherche pour le Développement, in Nouméa, New Caledonia, for his efforts in collecting the type material for this species and for many other New Caledonian callionymids.

References

richeri
Fish of the Pacific Ocean
Fish of East Asia
Taxa named by Ronald Fricke
Fish described in 2000